Wayne Vernon Estes (May 13, 1943 – February 8, 1965) was an American basketball player. He was a 6'6" (1.98 m) All-American forward for the Utah State Aggies from 1962 to 1965.  Wayne is the fourth-leading scorer in Utah State history, with 2,001 points and the fourth-leading rebounder (893).  He holds school records for career points per game (26.7), free throws made in a career (469), consecutive 10-point games (64), points in a season (821), points per game in a season (33.7), points in a game (52), and rebounds in a game (28).  He was the second leading scorer in the nation in 1965, just behind Rick Barry.

High school 

Estes earned all-state honors in three sports for the Anaconda Copperheads: football, basketball, and track. Estes earned three letters each in football and basketball (freshmen were unable to play varsity football and basketball at this time) and four letters in track.  

Estes was the Montana state class A champion discus and shot put thrower in his senior season.  He still holds the Anaconda high school shot put record with a mark of 59' 4.5".

During his high school basketball career, Estes scored 1,430 points.  Only Minneapolis Lakers Center Ed Kalafat, who racked up 1,561 points, outscored Estes while at Anaconda High School.

Accidental death 
On the night of February 8, 1965, Wayne Estes played what would be the last game of his college career, against the University of Denver in the Nelson Field House. Estes scored 48 points during this game, eclipsing the 2,000-point mark of his career.

Bounce pass to Estes. Puts the ball behind his back. Turns and looks out front to Hal Hale…(Estes) looks at his defense, pushes, and it's…in! Oh, great! Wayne Estes has now scored two-thousand points in a three-year career.  —Play-by-play announcer Reid Andreasen, KVNU Radio, Feb. 8, 1965

After the game, Estes and some friends stopped at the scene of a car accident near campus.  While crossing the street, Estes brushed against a downed high power line and was fatally electrocuted. Estes would have likely been a high draft pick in the National Basketball Association (NBA) in 1965.  The Los Angeles Lakers had intended to draft him in the first round. Estes was posthumously given All-American honors by the Associated Press and also earned a posthumous consensus Second Team All-American distinction. His number of #33 was posthumously retired by the Aggies. Wayne is buried in the Sunset Memorial cemetery near Fairmont, Montana just southeast of Anaconda.

NCAA career statistics

|-
| style="text-align:left;"| 1962–63
| style="text-align:left;"| Utah State
| 27 || ... || ... || .479 || ... || .838 || 9.5 || ... || ... || ... || 20.0
|-
| style="text-align:left;"| 1963–64
| style="text-align:left;"| Utah State
| 29 || ... || ... || .479 || ... || .853 || 13.0 || ... || ... || ... || 28.3
|-
| style="text-align:left;"| 1964–65
| style="text-align:left;"| Utah State
| 19 || ... || ... || .486 || ... || .878 || 13.7 || ... || ... || ... || 33.7
|-
| style="text-align:left;" colspan=2|Career
| 75 || ... || ... || .481 || ... || .856 || 11.9 || ... || ... || ... || 26.7

Wayne Estes Center

In May 2013, Utah State University announced the construction of the $9.7 million Wayne Estes Center, which will serve as a practice facility for the Utah State University Aggies men's and women's basketball teams and  house a competition venue  women's volleyball team. In the foyer will be a visual tribute to Wayne Estes. The center was made possible by a $5.25 million gift from Jim and Carol Laub and a $1.3 million gift from Blake Kirby. Groundbreaking was held in June 2013 and completion was scheduled for April 2014.

See also
List of basketball players who died during their careers

References

External links 
 Big Blue CheeseHeads Wayne Estes memorial page
 Utah State University Basketball All-Century Team
 1964-65 AP All-Americans

1943 births
1965 deaths
Accidental deaths by electrocution
Accidental deaths in Utah
All-American college men's basketball players
American men's basketball players
Basketball players from Montana
People from Anaconda, Montana
Small forwards
Utah State Aggies men's basketball players